Tonnus Oosterhoff (Leiden, 18 March 1953) is a Dutch poet and writer.

Biography 
Born in Leiden, Tonnus Oosterhoff spent most of life in the Dutch province of Groningen. He studied Dutch literature and linguistics at the University of Groningen. Before publishing literary work, he wrote several anonymous stories for the magazine Mijn Geheim. One of them was republished in his later collection of short stories Dans zonder vloer ("Dance without floor", 2003) with an alternate "less unrealistic" happy end.

He made his debut in the literary magazine Raster. Oosterhoff published collections of poems, short stories, essays, a novel, a play and a radio drama. His oeuvre distinguishes itself by the use of subdued humour and the desire the reinvent itself with every new book. In 2001 he launched a website with moving poems. In 2005 he was a guest writer at his old university in Groningen.

In 2008 Oosterhoff received the Awater Poëzieprijs for his work Ware grootte.

In 2012 Oosterhoff received the P. C. Hooft Award for his, according to the jury, "highly renewing poetry".

Bibliography 
Oosterhoff's books are published by De Bezige Bij in Amsterdam.

Boerentijger (1990) – poems
Vogelzaken (1991) – short stories
Denkbeeldige genietingen (1992) – radio drama KRO
De ingeland (1993) – poems
Het dikke hart (1994) – novel
De vergroeiing (1995) – radio drama RVU
Kan niet vernietigd worden (1996) – short stories
(Robuuste tongwerken,) een stralend plenum (1997) – poems
Wient maakt een kistje (1999) – play
Ook de schapen dachten na (2000) – essays
Wij zagen ons in een kleine groep mensen veranderen (2002) – poems
Dans zonder vloer (2003) – short stories
Hersenmutor. Gedichten 1990–2005 (2005) – collected poems
Ware grootte (2008) – poems
Handschreeuwkoor (2008) – poems in handwriting
Leegte lacht (2011) – poems

Awards 
1990: C. Buddingh'-prijs for Boerentijger
1994: Herman Gorter-prijs for De ingeland
1995: Multatuliprijs for Het dikke hart
1998: Jan Campertprijs for (Robuuste tongwerken,) een stralend plenum
2003: VSB Poëzieprijs for Wij zagen ons in een kleine groep mensen veranderen
2010: Guido Gezelleprijs van de stad Brugge for Ware grootte
2012: P. C. Hooft Award for his whole poetic oeuvre

References

External links 
 
 
  Profile at the National Library of the Netherlands

1953 births
Living people
Dutch male poets
P. C. Hooft Award winners
People from Leiden
University of Groningen alumni
C. Buddingh' Prize winners